Bearer may refer to:

 Beam (structure) or bearer, a structural element
 Bearer (carrier) or porter, a person who carries objects
 Bearer channel, a telecommunications term
 Bearer instrument, a type of document
 Bearer token, a type of security token in OAuth that gives access to its bearer
 Armiger, person entitled to bear arms
 Ownership

See also 
 
 Bear (disambiguation)
 Bearing (disambiguation)